Silvermine Nature Reserve forms part of the Table Mountain National Park in Cape Town, South Africa. It covers the section of the Cape Peninsula mountain range from the Kalk Bay mountains through to Constantiaberg. The area is a significant conservation area for the indigenous fynbos vegetation, which is of the montane cone-bush type at this location.

The Ou Kaapse Weg main road runs through the reserve, cutting it into a northern and southern section.

Until 2000, there were significant pine stands in the reserve, but the last of these were felled in following the major fire in that year. The area was again burnt in March 2015 and the reserve was closed for the rest of the year.

The area is popular for walking, hiking, picnicking, and mountain biking. There are a number of sandstone cave systems in the reserve and there are rock climbing routes on Muizenberg Peak.

The Silvermine River (Western Cape), which starts in the reserve and runs to Clovelly, is the only river in the Cape Peninsula that runs its whole course without going through a developed area.

The South African Navy's Maritime Rescue Co-ordination Centre is in an underground bunker on the lower slopes of the Silvermine mountain.

References 

Climbing areas of South Africa
South African Navy
Nature reserves in Cape Town
Table Mountain National Park